The 2014 World Cup of Pool was the ninth edition of the tournament. The event was once again held in England, this time at the Mountbatten Centre, Portsmouth, from 23 to 28 September. The 2014 event was sponsored by Betway.

Prize fund
Winners (per pair): $60,000
Runners-up (per pair): $30,000
Semi-finalists (per pair): $16,000
Quarter-finalists (per pair): $10,000	
Last 16 losers (per pair): $5,000
Last 32 losers (per pair): $3,000

Participating nations

Seeded teams:
 (Dennis Orcollo & Lee Vann Corteza)
 (Niels Feijen & Nick van den Berg)
 (Wang Can & Dang Jinhu)
 A (Darren Appleton & Karl Boyes)
 (Shane Van Boening & Earl Strickland)
 (Chang Yu-lung & Hsu Kai Lun)
 (Ralf Souquet & Thorsten Hohmann)
 (Mika Immonen & Petri Makkonen)
 (Karol Skowerski & Mateusz Śniegocki)
 (Alex Pagulayan & John Morra)
 (Albin Ouschan & Mario He)
 (Hayato Hijikata & Masaaki Tanaka)
 (Nikos Ekonomopoulos & Alexander Kazakis)
 B (Daryl Peach & Chris Melling)
 (Serge Das & Olivier Mortier)
 (Fabio Petroni & Daniele Corrieri)

Unseeded teams:
 (Phil Reilly & James Georgiadis)
 (Alejandro Carvajal & Enrique Rojas)
 (Ivica Putnik & Karlo Dalmatin)
 (Roman Hybler & Michal Gavenciak)
 (Stephan Cohen & Alex Montpelier)
 (Raj Hundal & Amar Kang)
 (Irsal Nasution & Muhammad Zulfikri)
 (Jeong Yung Hwa & Ha Minuk)
 (Ibrahim Amir & Alan Tan)
 (Tony Drago & Alex Borg)
 (Manuel Gama & Guilherme Sousa)
 (Waleed Majid & Bashar Hussain)
 (Konstantin Stepanov & Ruslan Chinakhov)
 (David Alcaide & Francisco Diaz-Pizarro)
 (Andreas Gerwen & Tomas Larsson)
 (Dimitri Jungo & Ronni Regli)

Tournament bracket

References

External links

2014
2014 in cue sports
2014 in English sport
September 2014 sports events in the United Kingdom
Sport in Portsmouth
International sports competitions hosted by England